Abdel Majid Senoussi (born 16 May 1960) is a Tunisian judoka. He competed in the men's half-heavyweight event at the 1984 Summer Olympics.

References

1960 births
Living people
Tunisian male judoka
Olympic judoka of Tunisia
Judoka at the 1984 Summer Olympics
Place of birth missing (living people)
African Games medalists in judo
Competitors at the 1987 All-Africa Games
African Games gold medalists for Tunisia
20th-century Tunisian people
21st-century Tunisian people